"Everything That Glitters (Is Not Gold)" is a song co-written and recorded by American country music artist Dan Seals.  It was released in March 1986 as the third single from the album Won't Be Blue Anymore.  It peaked at number one in both the United States and Canada.  The song was written by Seals and Bob McDill.

Content
The song's narrator has an estranged wife popular on the national livestock rodeo circuit who left him alone to raise their daughter Casey. He and Casey compete at various regional rodeo competitions, and the narrator mentions Casey's constant curiosity about her mother throughout their travels. Casey is also approaching puberty, and he falls short of answers to her questions, especially since his wife does not keep in contact with them. Despite the estrangement and the bitterness he now feels, he sometimes remembers wistfully the way he felt about her when he was in love with her, but that he now seemingly believes she wasn't cut out to be a wife and mother.

Music video

Two music videos of the song exist:

The first, a live performance of the song, appeared in 1986 to support the single.

A music video of the song, directed by Neil Abramson, appeared in Seals' video compilation, A Portrait (1991).

Chart positions

References

1986 singles
1985 songs
Dan Seals songs
Songs written by Bob McDill
Songs written by Dan Seals
Song recordings produced by Kyle Lehning
EMI Records singles